Landmark Square is a 24-story office building in Long Beach, California. Landau Partnership designed the building, while Englekirk Partners, Inc. was the structural engineer. Landmark Square was completed in 1991. The high-rise features a helipad on the roof and has received a LEED silver rating.

See also
List of tallest buildings in Long Beach

References

Office buildings completed in 1991
Skyscrapers in Long Beach, California
Skyscraper office buildings in California